The Mayo Women's Football League is a women's association football league featuring teams from County Mayo. It is the sister league of the Mayo Association Football League. It has previously been known as the Mayo Ladies League. The league is a summer league, beginning in March and ending in September. In 2015 the league was sponsored by Artec Facilities Management, a company based in Belmullet. Teams from the league  also compete for the Mayo Cup, the Mary Walsh Cup and the Mayo Shield. They also enter the Connaught Cup and the WFAI Intermediate Cup. The league's representative team won the 2006 FAI Women's Cup and then represented the Republic of Ireland in the 2007–08 UEFA Women's Cup.

2015 teams

Castlebar Celtic had planned to enter a team for the 2015 season but withdrew due to a lack of players.

List of recent winners

Representative team

FAI Women's Cup
In 2004 the Mayo Ladies League entered a representative team in the FAI Women's Cup for the first time. In 2005 they reached the semi-finals but lost 2–1 to Peamount United. In 2006 Mayo went one stage further and reached the final after defeating the Limerick Ladies League, Wilton United and Lifford Ladies. In the final at Richmond Park they played a UCD team featuring Nicola Sinnott and Sylvia Gee. Mayo won the cup after defeating UCD 1–0, with Aoife Herbert scoring the winning goal after just thirteen minutes. In 2007 Mayo were quarter finalists, losing 2–1 to Lifford Ladies.

2007–08 UEFA Women's Cup
As a result of winning the 2006 FAI Women's Cup, the Mayo Ladies League qualified to represent the Republic of Ireland in the 2007–08 UEFA Women's Cup. They were drawn in Group A3 along with Neulengbach, Hibernian Ladies and Gol Częstochowa. The competition format saw Mayo travel to Austria in August 2007 to play in a mini-tournament to decide who would progress to the next round. In addition to playing association football, several members of the Mayo squad including Yvonne Byrne, Aoife Herbert, Cora Staunton and Michelle Ruane also played Gaelic football and were prominent members of Mayo senior ladies' football team during the 2007 All-Ireland Senior Ladies' Football Championship. The UEFA Women's Cup tournament clashed with a quarter-final game against Monaghan. Byrne, Herbert and Staunton all returned to Ireland during the tournament to play for the Mayo Gaelic football team and as a result were not available for all three games. Byrne, Herbert and Staunton all went on to represent the Mayo GAA team in the 2007 All-Ireland Senior Ladies' Football Championship Final.

Squad

Matches and final table

References

Women's association football leagues in the Republic of Ireland
Association football in County Mayo
Sports leagues established in 2000
2000 establishments in Ireland
Association football leagues in Connacht
Summer association football leagues